ODU may stand for:
 Civic Democratic Union, a former party in Slovakia
 Odigo User File, a file extension used in Odigo Messenger
 Ohio Dominican University in Columbus, Ohio, United States
 Old Dominion University in Norfolk, Virginia, United States
 Operational Dress Uniform, a work uniform of the United States Coast Guard
 Optical channel Data Unit, the digital path layer for the Optical Transport Network (OTN)
 Out-Door Unit, a unit used in microwave transmission

See also 
 Odu (disambiguation)
 Odus (disambiguation)